Arundhati is a 2009 Indian Telugu-language horror fantasy film directed by Kodi Ramakrishna, and produced by Shyam Prasad Reddy, under his banner, Mallemala Entertainments. The film stars Anushka Shetty in the titular role with Sonu Sood, Deepak, Sayaji Shinde, Manorama, and Kaikala Satyanarayana. The music is composed by Koti with cinematography by K. K. Senthil Kumar and editing by Marthand K. Venkatesh.

Released on 16 January 2009, the film was a major commercial success and went onto become one of the highest-grossing Telugu films in history at the time. The success of the film turned Anushka into a major movie star overnight in Telugu cinema. The film received several accolades, including ten Nandi Awards, and two Filmfare Awards South. 

The film was remade in Bengali with the same name in 2014.

Plot
Arundhati, a descendent of a royal clan based in Gadwal is adored by her family and is considered to be the reincarnation of her paternal grandfather's mother Jejamma for being a doppelganger of the latter and being the first female child of the family after three generations ever since Jejamma died. Arundhati is engaged to Rahul while Arundhati's relatives: a couple, while on their way to Gadwal meet with an accident but stay unscathed. They see a decorated mansion at a short distance and go to seek help but are horrified by a ghost of a woman, disguised as the landlady who wants the couple to break a tomb protected by divine Yantras in a room of upper floor and free "her son" from it. The wife vanishes into thin air while the husband goes insane and the decorated mansion turns out to be ruined and not beautiful as the couple had seen earlier.

Arundhati's paternal grandfather Bhupati Raja finds himself injured by an accident caused by the ghost which brings Arundati to Gadwal, which is desired by the ghost imprisoned in the tomb. Arundhati clashes with Anwar, a Fakir who evicts malevolent spirits from (or) evil control on a person when he tries to do the same with the insane husband as she doesn't believe in ghosts and related stuff. That night, she receives a misleading phone call from Rahul, apparently who invites her to the old mansion. In the mansion, Arundhati sees the tomb and is provoked to free the ghost but she is taken away from the mansion by Anwar, who helps her see ghosts, making her believe in his words. He warns her to leave Gadwal as evil powers are after her. To know about the old mansion which belongs to her clan, Arundhati asks their family's maid Chandramma who had been serving the clan since the time of Jejamma and is treated as a family member rather than a servant.

Chandramma narrates to the whole family that the mansion was inherited by Raja Chinna Venkata Rangarayudu who had two daughters: Bhargavi and Jejamma. Bhargavi was married to Pasupathi: her cross-cousin and son of Jalajamma, Rangarayudu's sister. Pasupathi and Jalajamma are greedy for the property and hope that the former inherit the wealth for which Jalajamma deceitfully convinced Rangarayudu to get Bhargavi married to Pasupathi, a cruel womanizer. Jejamma fumed with anger when Pasupathi molested and murdered her blind dance teacher Kanchana and requested her father to evict him and his mother out of Gadwal but her father resisted as Bhargavi's life would be ruined. Considering herself an obstacle for her maternal family's reputation, she hung herself and died. Pasupathi arrived drunk at the funeral and insulted Bhargavi's corpse resulting in the enraged Jejamma to oust him out of the kingdom but not before having him beaten up by the people of Gadwal and tying him to his horse, which dragged him to the forest. He was presumed to be dead and Gadwal celebrated the death of a cruel man. Jejamma continued to be loved by the people for her act and grew up to be a beautiful young lady, trained in arts and warfare. Pasupathi, who did not die was rescued by Aghoris, who were passing by. To avenge what was done to him, Pasupathi mastered Black magic and returned to Gadwal on Jejamma's wedding day.

Wreaking havoc, Pasupathi partially disrobed Jejamma who then lured him into the room where Pasupathi murdered Kanchana using her dance. She cut off his tongue to prevent him from uttering incantations, pinned his hands to prevent him from doing Blackmagic and commanded a chandelier to fall on his body. She spared his life when sages present at the mansion tell her that his Pretatma would be more powerful and destroy Gadwal. To prevent his Pretatma from emerging after his death, she built a tomb around him when he was alive and made it capable of stopping his Pretatma from coming out of it using Yantras, a powerful trident and divine enchantments. The royal family deserted the mansion and started to live in another one.

At present, Chandramma stops narrating as the next part of the story is something frightening. However, upon being privately insisted by Arundhati, Chandramma says that despite being imprisoned in the tomb, Pasupathi's Pretatma, after his death inside it continued to ruin the happiness of Gadwal by inducing several diseases, drought and famine. Jejamma was also warned by his Pretatma from the tomb.

Presently, the insane husband breaks the tomb when Pasupathi's Pretatma mimics his wife to lure him. Freed, Pasupathi's vengeful ghost starts to trouble Arundhati desiring to fulfil his sexual desires with her and murder her, who stays back at Gadwal by making excuses upon being threatened by Pasupathi while her family leaves to Hyderabad. Realizing that she has been going through, Chandramma and Anwar help Arundhati realize that she is Jejamma's incarnation. Arundhati finds inscriptions, written by Jejamma on her own painting and learns that Jejamma, when she had gone to several temples and priests to find a solution to completely destroy Pasupathi, crossed paths with few Aghoras who suggested that the weapon capable of killing him is herself and for the weapon, Jejamma must die and claim that she would be reincarnated in her own family for accomplishing the task using the weapon. As a result, Arundhati returned to Gadwal, bid a farewell to her family and people and returned to Aghoras, who gave her a painful death and after skeletonizing her corpse, fashioned a dagger from her bones, which they safely hid.

Presently, Anwar and Arundhati set out to search for the weapon while Chandramma is asked to stay at Anwar's home. Rahul is threatened by Pasupathi's ghost over a phone call and after seeing his driver commit suicide after behaving strangely and attempting to run the car over him, Rahul complies and arrives at Gadwal. Chandramma spots him and attempts to stop him but he fails to see her and she is murdered by Pasupathi. Arundhati and Anwar, while on their way to Aghoras meet with an accident caused by Pasupathi resulting in Anwar falling off the cliff. Arundhati runs with fear and meets Rahul while the family arrives and is devastated to see Arundhati in a frightened state. They learn of Chandramma's death while Arundhati's family is abducted by Pasupathi leaving Arundhati with no option but to surrender herself to him, who possesses the insane man. However, Anwar turns out to be alive, meets the Aghoras and procures the weapon. He returns to the old mansion and gives the weapon to Arundhati, who stabs Pasupathi with it but he doesn't die. Pasupathi kills Anwar when he tries to inform Arundhati that the dagger would gain power to kill a Pretatma only if it is drenched in Arundhati's blood. When Pasupathi attempts to molest Arundhati, the latter stabs herself using the same dagger unwilling to let his greed be fulfilled. The dagger gains divine powers and Arundhati transforms into Jejamma to stab him and kill him to death.

The mansion burns and explodes while the family manages to run safe out of it and presume Arundhati to be dead but she returns like Jejamma.

Cast

Production

Development
Shyam Prasad Reddy revealed that he got the idea of Arundhati while receiving National Awards for the film Anji (2004). Being inspired from films like Chandramukhi and The Exorcist, he made it a female-oriented story "for a bigger appeal so that the entire family could watch it. I added classical dance to it. I wanted to mount the film on a grandeur scale.[sic] I wanted to play the film on 'fear of the evil spirit'. Arundhati is about good fighting evil. Hence I had to make sure that both the characters of Arundhati and Pasupati equally powerful [sic]".

Casting
Shyam Prasad Reddy wanted somebody with a 5'10" (5 feet 10 inches) height and "should look royal because she is the queen, and she rides on horses and elephants". Gemini Kiran suggested Shyam Prasad Reddy to choose Anushka for the role. After conducting her photoshoot, Shyam Prasad Reddy explained the story and Arundhati's characterisation.  Reddy wanted Tamil actor Pasupathy to enact the role of an antagonist of the same name but since the character has "a royal side to the character where he has to look princely", he had chosen Sonu Sood for the role after seeing his performance in Ashok (2006).

For the characterisation of Fakir who helps Anushka's character in the present era, Shyam Prasad Reddy drew inspiration from the priest character in the 1976 American horror film The Omen. He considered Naseeruddin Shah, Nana Patekar and Atul Kulkarni for the role; however, none of their dates were available. Sayaji Shinde was finally chosen for the character.

Principal photography 
Filming took around 250 days, in Hyderabad and other places. The interior of the place is shot at the Annapurna Studios, while the exterior was at Banganapalle fort. Filming also took place at Ramanaidu Studios.

Post production

Dubbing 
Sowmya Sharma had dubbed for the character of modern-day Arundhati and Shilpa for Jejjama. Dubbing voice for Sonu Sood was provided by P. Ravishankar. Ravishankar completed the dubbing within 14 days and found it to be "most challenging work" and his voice "has gone sore for 5 times during this process".

Visual effects 
Rahul Nambiar was appointed as Creative Director and Visual Effects Supervisor by Shyam Prasad Reddy for this feature film. Nambiar felt that showcasing a ghost as the main villain, throughout the film was challenging. With help of some dedicated scenes written, visualization, and visual effects, Nambiar and his team could achieve and what they had planned with Reddy.

Nambiar also stated "We created all the action in computer dolls, animated all of them and added all the film cameras and made it like a film. We saw it as a rough edit and then we shot it. There was a lot of meticulous work. The pre-production itself took about seven months".

Music
The music and background music of this film was composed by Koti. The soundtrack was critically acclaimed. Especially the tracks "Jejamma", "Chandamama" and "Bhu Bhu" and in Tamil "Bhoomi Kodhikum" , "Gummiruttil Kudamkizhithu kundril ezhum" , "Enna Viratham Ettrai Neeyamma" were huge hits. The album featured eminent singers like K. S. Chithra, Kailash Kher, Kalpana Raghavendar and N. C. Karunya. Koti, while speaking said that this film helped him to prove himself and in his career of 30 years this was his personal best. The track "Jejamma" required a majestic and ambient grandeur, so Koti selected Kailash Kher. The track "Bhu Bhu" took many days for Koti to compose and he felt it should be sung by an amazing singer who could aptly give the ferocious feel and hence went with Chithra. Lyrics were written by Veturi for "Bhu Bhu Bhujangam", Anant Sriram for "Chandamama", and C. Narayana Reddy for "Jejamma". This album features four songs and three instrumentals.

Release
The Tamil dubbed version of the film, which was launched by Sri Thenandal Films, was released on 20 March 2009.

Home Media
The film satellite rights was bagged by Gemini TV

Reception

Critical reception
Rediff gave it three stars out of five and said, "The main plus points of the film are screenplay (creative director Rahul Nambiar and the Mallemalla Unit), art direction (Ashok), cinematography (Senthil Kumar), editing (Marthand K. Venkatesh), special effects and the performances of Anushka [Images], Sonu Sood and Sayaji Shinde. On the whole, Arundhati is a watchable film provided you don't have a weak heart and don't get into discussing logic, science, and rationality. Just watch what unfolds on the screen – for that's visual grandeur". Sify gave its verdict as "Worth a watch" with four stars noted, "The film has come across with some really mind-blowing graphics and presentation, even the performances were top-notch that helped. While the drums scene is a take from the Chinese movie 'House of Flying Daggers' it was well taken and presented. The shock points are high and one can say that the film is definitely not for the weak-hearted. There are enough chilling moments to shake the audience off their chair. The film is one of the best made ever in the history of Telugu cinema in terms of technical values so it deserves to be a good hit". Behindwoods reviewing the Tamil dubbed version, gave 3 out of 5 stars and stated "Old school horror, new age film making".

Box office
The film grossed 70 crore at the box office with 3 crore from overseas markets. The satellite rights of the film were sold to Gemini TV for  7 crore.

Accolades 
Nandi Awards 2008
Though the film was released in 2009, it was registered for 2008 films for Nandi Awards. The film received a total of 10 Nandi awards.
 Best Villain – Sonu Sood
 Best Child Actress – Divya Nagesh
 Best Editor – Marthand K Venkatesh
 Best Art Director – Ashok
 Best Audiographer – Radhakrishna & Madhusudhan Reddy
 Best Costume Designer – Deepa Chandar
 Best Makeup Artist – Ramesh Mahanti
 Best Male Dubbing Artist – P. Ravi Shankar
 Best Special Effects – Rahul Nambiar
 Special Jury Award – Anushka Shetty

Filmfare Awards South – 2009
 Best Actress – Telugu – Anushka Shetty
 Best Supporting Actor – Telugu – Sonu Sood
Santosham Film Awards
 Best Director – Kodi Ramakrishna
 Best Producer – Shyam Prasad Reddy
 Best Actress – Anushka Shetty
 Best Villain – Sonu Sood
 Best Dubbing Artist Male – P. Ravi Shankar
 Best Cameraman – K. K. Senthil Kumar

Legacy
Arundhati'''s success turned Anushka into one of the most sought-after actresses in Telugu and catapulted her into the foray of leading Telugu actresses. Sonu Sood attained stardom with this film and went on to work in several South Indian films as an antagonist. After the release of Arundhati, people began recognising him as Pasupathi. P. Ravishankar who dubbed for him also became popular and was referred to as 'Bommali or Bommayi Ravi Shankar' by the media thereafter.

According to writer Gopimohan, Arundhati made audience to "welcome creative content" and Magadheera started a trend of experimentation with period, socio-fantasy and spiritual themes that was continued in films like Panchakshari (2010), Nagavalli (2010), Anaganaga O Dheerudu (2011), Mangala (2011), Sri Rama Rajyam (2011) and Uu Kodathara? Ulikki Padathara? (2012). Tammareddy Bharadwaja said "Ever since Arundhati and Magadheera did well at the box office, the rest of the industry started following their footsteps. Also, since there is an irrational craze to make high budget films right now, producers are turning towards mythological films. It is the only genre where you can boast of spending crores for creating the sets and the look of the film. But what they don't realize is that if these films flop, the blow to the producer will be severe." Films like Anaganaga O Dheerudu (2011) and Sakthi (2011) were commercial failures and Badrinath (2012) was an average grosser; all being fantasy films in which the protagonist is a warrior.

 See also 
 Arundhati''

References

External links
 

2000s Telugu-language films
2009 films
Indian supernatural horror films
Indian epic films
Telugu films remade in other languages
Films directed by Kodi Ramakrishna
Indian ghost films
Films about reincarnation
Films scored by Koti
Films set in Telangana
Films about telekinesis
2000s supernatural horror films
2009 psychological thriller films
Demons in film
Supernatural drama films
Indian psychological horror films
Indian horror drama films
Religious horror films
Films about exorcism
2000s fantasy drama films
Indian nonlinear narrative films
Films shot in Hyderabad, India
Films set in Hyderabad, India
Films set in ancient India
2009 drama films